The 2012–13 Borussia Mönchengladbach season was the 112th season in the club's football history. In 2012–13 the club played in the Bundesliga, the top tier of German football. It was the club's fifth consecutive season in this league, having been promoted from the 2. Bundesliga in 2008.

The club also took part in the 2012–13 edition of the DFB-Pokal, the German Cup, where it reached the second round and lost to fellow Bundesliga side Fortuna Düsseldorf.

In Europe the club qualified for the 2012–13 edition of the UEFA Europa League, where it played AEL Limassol, Fenerbahçe and Marseille in Group C of the group stage. The club had qualified for the play-off round of the 2012–13 UEFA Champions League but was knocked out by Dynamo Kyiv.

Review and events

Matches

Legend

Friendly matches

Bundesliga

League table

Matches

DFB-Pokal

Europe

UEFA Champions League

Playoff round

UEFA Europa League

Group stage

Knockout phase

Round of 32

Squad

Squad and statistics

Squad, appearances and goals

|-
! colspan="14" style="background:#dcdcdc; text-align:center;"| Goalkeepers

|-
! colspan="14" style="background:#dcdcdc; text-align:center;"| Defenders

|-
! colspan="14" style="background:#dcdcdc; text-align:center"| Midfielders

|-
! colspan="14" style="background:#dcdcdc; text-align:center"| Strikers

|}

Transfers

In

Out

Kits

Sources

External links
 2012–13 Borussia Mönchengladbach season at Weltfussball.de 
 2012–13 Borussia Mönchengladbach season at kicker.de 
 2012–13 Borussia Mönchengladbach season at Fussballdaten.de 

Borussia Monchengladbach
Borussia Monchengladbach
Borussia Mönchengladbach seasons
Borussia Monchengladbach